The 1991 Liège–Bastogne–Liège was the 77th edition of the Liège–Bastogne–Liège cycle race and was held on 21 April 1991. The race started and finished in Liège. The race was won by Moreno Argentin of the Ariostea team.

General classification

References

1991
1991 in Belgian sport
1991 in road cycling
April 1991 sports events in Europe
1991 UCI Road World Cup